Fishing Without Nets is a 2014 American drama film written and directed by Cutter Hodierne. The film stars Abdikani Muktar, Abdi Siad, Abdiwali Farrah, Abdikhadir Hassan, Reda Kateb and Idil Ibrahim.

The film premiered in-competition in the US Dramatic Category at 2014 Sundance Film Festival on January 17, 2014. It won an award at the festival.

Synopsis
A Somali father turns to piracy in order to support his family. However, he begins to experience intense ethical reservations.

Cast
Abdikani Muktar as Khadir
Abdi Siad as Blacky
Abdiwali Farrah as China Boy
Reda Kateb as Victor
Idil Ibrahim as Idil
Eric Godon as Captain Charlie
Abdikhadir Hassan

Production
Hodierne, originally made the short film of the same name in 2012. It won the Grand Jury Prize in Short Filmmaking at the 2012 Sundance Film Festival.

Critical response
Fishing Without Nets met with positive response from critics upon its premiere at the 2014 Sundance Film Festival. Dennis Harvey, in his review for Variety, praised the film that "Cutter Hodierne makes an accomplished feature debut with this very well-crafted, empathetic hijacking drama." John DeFore of The Hollywood Reporter in his review said that "While the setup and the moral dilemmas are all familiar from crime stories told in other settings, Hodierne does a fine job balancing the elements. The movie never reaches the sweating-bullets heights of its Hollywood cousin, but it's distinct enough from that film to keep us watching." Ryland Aldrich from TwitchFilm praised the direction and editing that "From the gorgeous visuals to the incredible acting by non-professionals, Fishing Without Nets takes a world to which we've been recently introduced, and expands it to magnificent results."

Accolades

References

External links
 
 
 

2014 films
2014 drama films
American drama films
Pirate films
Sundance Film Festival award winners
Films set in Somalia
2010s English-language films
2010s American films